Bodens BK is a Swedish football club located in Boden in Norrbotten. The club was formed on 2 November 1916 and began playing soccer in 1918. It is currently playing in the third tier of Swedish football, Division 1.

Linguistics

Note that the s in the first part of the club name (Bodens) is the Swedish possessive s, meaning that it is not correct to call the club just Bodens. Correct forms are Bodens Bandyklubb (the complete name, very formal), Bodens BK (abbreviated formal), BBK (abbreviated informal), or just Boden (since there are no other football clubs with the town name Boden in their name). Bandyklubb means bandy club, but the club has actually not been playing bandy since 1966.

History

During the three seasons of 2003 to 2005, Boden played in the second highest division, Superettan, which made them the northernmost team in Swedish professional football by a margin of 400 km or more, depending on season.

After successfully staying up with some margin in 2003, the ensuing season saw Boden barely scrape through to avoid relegation on the last day of the season. The 2005 Superettan campaign appeared to be the most successful thus far, and included memorable victories against teams such as the previous year's top-flight residents Örebro SK (1–0) and AIK (5–1). With 24 games played and stunning form Boden seemed safe at mid-table, but failure to win or even draw any of their last six games, together with the Phoenix-like resurrection of near-discarded Mjällby AIF, saw the latter team secure a new contract while relegating Boden to the newly recreated Division 1.

For the 2006 season, the club which had managed to keep hold of several key players, entertained an outspoken ambition of instantly returning to Superettan. However, injuries to important staff such as the two main new signings, New Zealand striker Brent Fisher and American midfielder Ryan Caugherty, as well as poor results away from home, meant the team finished at a mediocre 8th place. The following season resulted in another mid-table finish. In 2008, Boden were relegated from Division 1 after finishing last, failing to record a single win in their last nine games.

Unlike what had been the case after their Superettan relegation in 2005, Boden did manage to immediately bounce back from Division 2 in 2009. In their first season back at Sweden's fourth tier level since 1998, the club produced a strong season finish, winning eight out of their last nine games and eventually the league, five points clear of local rivals IFK Luleå. Once back in Division 1, the objective for 2010 was survival, which was ensured only in the last game of the season, when Boden defeated Carlstad United away from home, leapfrogging that team into 10th place and a renewed contract. Unable to repeat the accomplishment, Boden were again relegated to Division 2 in 2011, finishing nine points from safety and winning only four league games.

In the two years that followed, Boden were unable to regain promotion, finishing fifth in Division 2 on both occasions. In 2014, the club produced an eighth-place finish, after uninspiring results.

Organization

The club is affiliated to the Norrbottens Fotbollförbund.

Achievements

 Division 2/Division 1/Superettan:
 Best placement (3rd): 1955–56
 Norrländska Mästerskapet:
 Winners (8): 1926, 1928, 1929, 1936, 1937, 1938, 1941, 1944
 Runners-up (3): 1925, 1939, 1949

Season to season

Attendances

In recent seasons Bodens BK FF have had the following average attendances:

References

External links

Unofficial supporters' site (archived)

 
Football clubs in Norrbotten County
Sport in Boden, Sweden
Association football clubs established in 1916
Bandy clubs established in 1916
1916 establishments in Sweden